Rock Sugar is an American rock band known for their mashups of pop music and heavy metal from the 1980s.

History
The band's fictitious backstory claims the sound was achieved when the metal band was stranded on a desert island in 1989 with a CD player, plenty of batteries, and the CD collection of a 13-year-old girl. The band signed with Paradigm in April 2010. In April 2012, the band signed with ARM Entertainment (Artist Representation and Management).

Lead singer Jess Harnell is better known for his voice work in film and television than his musical career. Harnell voiced Wakko Warner in the Animaniacs cartoon series, voiced Secret Squirrel in the 2 Stupid Dogs shorts and is the current official voice actor for Disney's Brer Rabbit. He has also served as the announcer for America's Funniest Home Videos for more than 10 years and has voiced the titular protagonist of the Crash Bandicoot series since 2005. In 1995, he released a solo album entitled The Sound of Your Voice.

Drummer/keyboardist/vocalist Alexander Track received a Master of Music Degree from the Academy of Music and Performing Arts, Vienna, Austria and won a Grammy Award for engineering in 2006. He is the President and CEO of Track Entertainment Studios in Los Angeles, California. He co-produced, recorded, engineered and co-mixed Rock Sugar's debut CD: Reimaginator.

Lead guitarist/vocalist Chuck Duran does voice over demos and dubs Steve Valentine's singing voice on the Disney XD series I'm in the Band. He is the co-host of the voice-over web series VO Buzz Weekly alongside Stacey J. Aswad.

Original member, bassist Johnny Santoro aka Johnny Five joined Rock Sugar in 2010. He left the band on August 29, 2011. On December 12, 2011, the band introduced their new bassist, Ken Cain.

On November 24, 2020, the band announced a new album, ReInventinator, to be crowdfunded on Kickstarter. The album was successfully funded and was released on April 19, 2021.

Band members
Current
 Jess Harnell - lead vocals (2010–present)
 Chuck Duran - lead guitar, vocals (2010–present)
 Ken Cain - bassist (2011–present)
 Alexander Track - drums, keyboard, vocals (2010–present)

Former
 Johnny Santoro - bassist (2010–2011)

Locations
The band's tour schedule includes rock festivals, once sharing the stage with members of Guns N' Roses. In April 2010, the band appeared on the Food Network show Private Chefs of Beverly Hills in an episode where the chefs prepare food for the band's CD release party. In April/May 2010, the band performed at the Melodic Rock Fest 2 in Elgin, Illinois sharing the stage with melodic rock bands Danger Danger, Y&T and Winger among others. The band has performed for foundations including the Toby Keith Foundation in Oklahoma and Larry the Cable Guy's Git-R-Done Foundation (Florida). In May 2010, the band performed two shows at the Beale Street Music Festival in Memphis, Tennessee. Along with securing residencies at the House of Blues, Sunset Blvd. Los Angeles and in Las Vegas, Rock Sugar shared the stage with the Scorpions and RATT in Memphis, Queensrÿche in Colorado, Poison in Idaho, Tesla in Albuquerque, Kid Rock, Saliva, Skillet and Hinder in Wisconsin, Cinderella in Montana among many others. Rock Sugar has been featured on the Fox Television Network on Fox & Friends performing in New York, Avenue of the Americas.
On 12 June 2010, Rock Sugar played at the Download Festival at Donington Park, England. They appeared at the festival again in 2011. Performances in 2012 included the Mid-South Rally for the Wounded Warrior Project, Mississippi and shows in Las Vegas, Lake Tahoe, Arkansas, Montana and at the Playboy Mansion in Los Angeles.

Albums

Reimaginator
Reimaginator was released in 2010. Each song is a mash-up of two or more songs. Each song has at least one rock or heavy metal song and one pop or pop rock song.

ReInventinator
ReInventinator was released in 2021 after being successfully crowdfunded

References

External links

Heavy metal musical groups from California
Musical groups from Los Angeles